Eulepidotis detracta is a moth of the family Erebidae first described by Francis Walker in 1858. It is found in the Neotropics, including Brazil.

References

Moths described in 1858
detracta